The following is a list of bomber airplanes and does not include bomber airships, organized by era and manufacturer. A bomber is a military aircraft designed to attack ground or sea targets.

|-
|| AEG G.I || Germany ||  || Heavy bomber || 1915 || Prototype ||  || 
|-
|| AEG G.II || Germany ||  || Heavy bomber || 1915 || Operational ||  ca. || 
|-
|| AEG G.III || Germany ||  || Heavy bomber || 1915 || Operational ||  || 
|-
|| AEG G.IV || Germany ||  || Heavy bomber || 1916 || Operational ||  || 
|-
|| AEG G.V || Germany ||  || Heavy bomber || 1918 || Operational ||  || 
|-
|| AEG N.I || Germany ||  || Night bomber || 1918 || Operational ||  || 
|-
|| AEG R.I || Germany ||  || Heavy bomber || 1916 || Prototype ||  || 
|-
|| Aermacchi MB-326 || Italy ||  || trainer/attack || 1957 || Operational ||  ||  
|-
|| Aermacchi MB-339 || Italy ||  || trainer/attack || 1976 || Operational || + ||  
|-
|| Aero A.100 || Czechoslovakia ||  || Reconnaissance bomber || 1933 || Operational ||  || 
|-
|| Aero A.101 || Czechoslovakia ||  || Reconnaissance bomber || 1934 || Operational ||  || 
|-
|| Aero A.11 || Czechoslovakia ||  || Reconnaissance bomber || 1925 || Operational ||  || 
|-
|| Aero A.12 || Czechoslovakia ||  || Reconnaissance bomber || 1923 || Operational ||  || 
|-
|| Aero A.24 || Czechoslovakia ||  || Bomber || 1924 || Prototype ||  || 
|-
|| Aero A.30 || Czechoslovakia ||  || Light bomber || 1927 || Operational ||  || 
|-
|| Aero A.304 || Czechoslovakia ||  || Bomber || 1937 || Operational ||  || 
|-
|| Aero A.42 || Czechoslovakia ||  || Bomber || 1929 || Prototype ||  || 
|-
|| Aero L-159 Alca || Czech Republic ||  || trainer/attack || 1997 || Operational ||  || 
|-
|| Aichi B7A || Japan ||  || Torpedo/dive bomber || 1942 || Operational ||  || 
|-
|| Aichi D1A || Japan ||  || Dive bomber || 1934 || Operational ||  || 
|-
|| Aichi D3A || Japan ||  || Dive bomber || 1938 || Operational ||  || 
|-
|| Aichi M6A || Japan ||  || Torpedo bomber || 1943 || Operational ||  ||  
|-
|| Airco DH.10 Amiens || UK ||  || Heavy bomber || 1918 || Operational ||  || 
|-
|| Airco DH.11 || UK ||  || Bomber || 1919 || Prototype ||  || 
|-
|| Airco DH.3 || UK ||  || Heavy bomber || 1916 || Prototype ||  || 
|-
|| Airco DH.4 || UK ||  || Bomber || 1916 || Operational ||  || 
|-
|| Airco DH.9 || UK ||  || Bomber || 1917 || Operational ||  || 
|-
|| Airco DH.9A || UK ||  || Bomber || 1918 || Operational ||  || 
|-
|| Airspeed Oxford || UK ||  || Bomber/trainer || 1937 || Operational ||  || 
|-
|| Albatros C.III || Germany ||  || Light bomber || 1915 || Operational ||  ||  
|-
|| Albatros C.VII/N.I || Germany ||  || Night bomber || 1916 || Operational || + || 
|-
|| Albatros G.I || Germany ||  || Heavy bomber || 1916 || Prototype ||  || 
|-
|| Albatros G.II || Germany ||  || Heavy bomber || 1916 || Prototype ||  || 
|-
|| Albatros G.III || Germany ||  || Heavy bomber || 1915 || Operational ||  || 
|-
|| Amiot 143M || France ||  || Medium bomber || 1931 || Operational ||  || 
|-
|| Amiot 354 || France ||  || Medium bomber || 1939 || Operational ||  ca. || ANBO VIII
|-
|| ANBO VIII || Lithuania ||  || Light bomber || 1939 || Prototype ||  || 
|-
|| ANF Les Mureaux 110 || France ||  || Reconnaissance bomber || 1931 || Operational ||  || 
|-
|| Arado Ar 234 || Germany ||  || Reconnaissance bomber || 1943 || Operational ||  || 
|-
|| Archangelski Ar-2 || USSR ||  || Dive bomber || 1940 || Operational ||  || 
|-
|| Armstrong Whitworth A.W.19 || UK ||  || Multi-role bomber || 1934 || Prototype ||  || 
|-
|| Armstrong Whitworth Albemarle || UK ||  || Bomber/transport || 1940 || Operational ||  || 
|-
|| Armstrong Whitworth Atlas || UK ||  || Reconnaissance bomber || 1925 || Operational ||  || 
|-
|| Armstrong Whitworth AW.23 || UK ||  || Heavy bomber || 1935 || Prototype ||  || 
|-
|| Armstrong Whitworth F.K.8 || UK ||  || Reconnaissance bomber || 1916 || Operational ||  || 
|-
|| Armstrong Whitworth Whitley || UK ||  || Bomber/maritime patrol || 1936 || Operational ||  || 
|-
|| Avro 504 || UK ||  || Bomber/trainer || 1913 || Operational ||  ||  
|-
|| Avro 523 Pike || UK ||  || Heavy bomber || 1916 || Prototype ||  || 
|-
|| Avro 529 || UK ||  || Heavy bomber || 1917 || Prototype ||  || 
|-
|| Avro 533 Manchester || UK ||  || Heavy bomber || 1918 || Prototype ||  || 
|-
|| Avro 549 Aldershot || UK ||  || Heavy bomber || 1921 || Operational ||  || 
|-
|| Avro 604 Antelope || UK ||  || Reconnaissance bomber || 1928 || Prototype ||  ||  
|-
|| Avro Anson || UK ||  || Maritime patrol || 1935 || Operational ||  ||  
|-
|| Avro Lancaster || UK ||  || Heavy bomber/maritime patrol || 1941 || Operational ||  || 
|-
|| Avro Lincoln || UK ||  || Heavy bomber || 1944 || Operational ||  || 
|-
|| Avro Manchester || UK ||  || Heavy bomber || 1939 || Operational ||  || 
|-
|| Avro Shackleton || UK ||  || Maritime patrol || 1949 || Operational 1990 ||  ||  
|-
|| Avro Vulcan || UK || Jet || Heavy bomber || 1952 || Operational ||  || 
|-
|| BAC Jet Provost || UK || Jet || trainer/attack || 1954 || Operational ||  ||  
|-
|| BAC Strikemaster || UK || Jet || trainer/attack || 1967 || Operational ||  || 
|-
|| BAC TSR-2 || UK || Jet || Reconnaissance bomber || 1964 || Prototype ||  || 
|-
|| Beardmore W.B.1 || UK ||  || Bomber || 1917 || Prototype ||  || 
|-
|| Beardmore W.B.VI || UK ||  || Torpedo bomber || n/a || cancelled project ||  || 
|-
|| Beechcraft XA-38 Grizzly || US ||  || Attack || 1944 || Prototype ||  || 
|-
|| Bellanca 77-140 || US ||  || Bomber || 1934 || Operational ||  || 
|-
|| Beriev Be-10 || USSR ||  || Maritime patrol || 1956 || Operational ||  || 
|-
|| Beriev Be-12 || USSR ||  || Maritime patrol || 1960 || Operational ||  || 
|-
|| Beriev Be-4 || USSR ||  || Maritime patrol || 1940 || Operational ||  || 
|-
|| Beriev Be-6 || USSR ||  || Maritime patrol || 1949 || Operational ||  || 
|-
|| Beriev MBR-2 || USSR ||  || Maritime patrol flying boat || 1931 || Operational ||  ||  
|-
|| Blackburn B-3 || UK ||  || Torpedo bomber || 1932 || Prototype ||  || 
|-
|| Blackburn B-48 Firecrest || UK ||  || Fighter bomber || 1947 || Prototype ||  || 
|-
|| Blackburn B-7 || UK ||  || Dive bomber || 1934 || Prototype ||  || 
|-
|| Blackburn Baffin || UK ||  || Torpedo bomber || 1932 || Operational ||  || 
|-
|| Blackburn Beagle || UK ||  || Torpedo bomber || 1928 || Prototype ||  || 
|-
|| Blackburn Blackburd || UK ||  || Torpedo bomber || 1918 || Prototype ||  || 
|-
|| Blackburn Botha || UK ||  || Torpedo bomber || 1938 || Operational ||  || 
|-
|| Blackburn Buccaneer || UK ||  || Attack || 1958 || Operational ||  || 
|-
|| Blackburn Cubaroo || UK ||  || Torpedo bomber || 1924 || Prototype ||  || 
|-
|| Blackburn Dart || UK ||  || Torpedo bomber || 1921 || Operational ||  || 
|-
|| Blackburn Firebrand || UK ||  || Torpedo bomber/fighter || 1942 || Operational ||  || 
|-
|| Blackburn Iris || UK ||  || Maritime patrol flying boat || 1926 || Operational ||  || 
|-
|| Blackburn Kangaroo || UK ||  || Maritime patrol/heavy bomber || 1918 || Operational ||  || 
|-
|| Blackburn Perth || UK ||  || Maritime patrol flying boat || 1933 || Operational ||  || 
|-
|| Blackburn Ripon || UK ||  || Torpedo bomber || 1926 || Operational ||  || 
|-
|| Blackburn Shark || UK ||  || Torpedo bomber || 1933 || Operational ||  || 
|-
|| Blackburn Skua || UK ||  || Dive bomber || 1937 || Operational ||  || 
|-
|| Blackburn Velos || UK ||  || Torpedo bomber || 1925 || Operational ||  || 
|-
|| Blériot 127 || France ||  || Heavy bomber || 1926 || Operational ||  || 
|-
|| Bleriot XI || France ||  || Reconnaissance bomber || 1909 || Operational || + || 
|-
|| Bloch MB.131 || France ||  || Reconnaissance bomber || 1936 || Operational ||  || 
|-
|| Bloch MB.174 || France ||  || Reconnaissance bomber || 1939 || Operational || + || 
|-
|| Bloch MB.200 || France ||  || Heavy bomber || 1933 || Operational ||  || 
|-
|| Boeing B-17 Flying Fortress || US ||  || Heavy bomber || 1935 || Operational ||  || 
|-
|| Boeing B-29 Superfortress/Washington || US ||  || Heavy bomber || 1942 || Operational ||  || 
|-
|| Boeing B-47 Stratojet || US ||  || Heavy bomber || 1947 || Operational ||  || 
|-
|| Boeing B-50 Superfortress || US ||  || Heavy bomber || 1947 || Operational ||  || 
|-
|| Boeing B-52 Stratofortress || US ||  || Heavy bomber || 1952 || Operational ||  || 
|-
|| Boeing XB-54 || US ||  || Heavy bomber || 1948 || Project ||  || 
|-
|| Boeing Model 306 || US ||  || Heavy bomber || 1935 || Project ||  || 
|-
|| Boeing P-8 Poseidon || US ||  || Maritime patrol || 2009 || Operational || + || 
|-
|| Boeing XB-15 || US ||  || Heavy bomber || 1937 || Prototype ||  || 
|-
|| Boeing XB-38 Flying Fortress || US ||  || Heavy bomber || 1943 || Prototype ||  || 
|-
|| Boeing XB-39 Superfortress || US ||  || Heavy bomber || 1944 || Prototype ||  || 
|-
|| Boeing XB-56 || US ||  || Heavy bomber || 1950 || Project ||  || 
|-
|| Boeing XB-59 || US ||  || Heavy bomber || 1952 || Project ||  || 
|-
|| Boeing XF8B || US ||  || Fighter bomber || 1944 || Prototype ||  || 
|-
|| Boeing XPBB Sea Ranger || US ||  || Maritime patrol || 1942 || Prototype ||  || 
|-
|| Boeing YB-9 || US ||  || Heavy bomber || 1931 || Operational ||  || 
|-
|| Bolkhovitinov DB-A || USSR ||  || Heavy bomber || 1935 || Operational ||  || 
|-
|| Boulton & Paul Bolton || UK ||  || Heavy bomber || 1922 || Prototype ||  || 
|-
|| Boulton & Paul Bugle || UK ||  || Heavy bomber || 1923 || Operational ||  || 
|-
|| Boulton Paul Bodmin || UK ||  || Heavy bomber || 1924 || Prototype ||  || 
|-
|| Boulton Paul Bourges || UK ||  || Heavy bomber || 1919 || Prototype ||  || 
|-
|| Boulton Paul Overstrand || UK ||  || Heavy bomber || 1933 || Operational ||  || 
|-
|| Boulton Paul P.32 || UK ||  || Night bomber || 1931 || Prototype ||  || 
|-
|| Boulton Paul Sidestrand || UK ||  || Heavy bomber || 1926 || Operational ||  || 
|-
|| Breda A.14 || Italy ||  || Night bomber || 1928 || Prototype ||  || 
|-
|| Breda A.8 || Italy ||  || Night bomber || 1927 || Prototype ||  || 
|-
|| Breda Ba.46 || Italy ||  || Bomber/transport || 1934 || Prototype ||  || 
|-
|| Breda Ba.64 || Italy ||  || Attack || 1934 || Operational ||  || 
|-
|| Breda Ba.65 || Italy ||  || Attack || 1935 || Operational ||  || 
|-
|| Breda Ba.88 || Italy ||  || Attack || 1936 || Operational ||  || 
|-
|| Breguet 14 || France ||  || Reconnaissance bomber || 1916 || Operational ||  || 
|-
|| Breguet 16 || France ||  || Night bomber || 1918 || Operational ||  ca. || 
|-
|| Breguet 19 || France ||  || Reconnaissance bomber || 1922 || Operational || + || 
|-
|| Breguet 270 Series || France ||  || Reconnaissance bomber || 1929 || Operational || + || 
|-
|| Bréguet 410 || France ||  || Bomber || 1931 || Prototype ||  || 
|-
|| Bréguet 460 Vultur || France ||  || Bomber || 1935 || Prototype ||  || 
|-
|| Breguet 521 || France ||  || Maritime patrol flying boat || 1933 || Operational ||  || 
|-
|| Breguet 693 || France ||  || Attack || 1938 || Operational ||  || 
|-
|| Breguet Alizé || France ||  || Maritime patrol || 1956 || Operational 2000 ||  || 
|-
|| Breguet Atlantique || France ||  || Maritime patrol || 1961 || Operational ||  || 
|-
|| Breguet Bre.4 || France ||  || Bomber || 1914 || Operational ||  ca. || 
|-
|| Breguet Bre.5 & 6 || France ||  || Bomber || 1915 || Operational || + || 
|-
|| Breguet Taon || France ||  || Fighter bomber || 1957 || Prototype ||  || 
|-
|| Breguet Vultur || France ||  || Attack || 1951 || Prototype ||  || 
|-
|| Brewster SB2A Buccaneer || US ||  || Bomber || 1941 || Operational ||  || 
|-
|| Bristol Beaufighter || UK ||  || Fighter bomber/torpedo bomber || 1939 || Operational ||  || 
|-
|| Bristol Beaufort || UK ||  || Torpedo bomber || 1938 || Operational ||  || 
|-
|| Bristol Berkeley || UK ||  || Heavy bomber || 1925 || Prototype ||  || 
|-
|| Bristol Blenheim || UK ||  || Medium bomber || 1935 || Operational ||  || 
|-
|| Bristol Bombay || UK ||  || Heavy bomber/transport || 1935 || Operational ||  || 
|-
|| Bristol Braemar || UK ||  || Heavy bomber || 1918 || Prototype ||  || 
|-
|| Bristol Buckingham || UK ||  || Medium bomber || 1943 || Operational ||  ||  
|-
|| Bristol TB.8 || UK ||  || Bomber || 1913 || Operational ||  || 
|-
|| Bristol Type 148 || UK ||  || Reconnaissance bomber || 1937 || Prototype ||  || 
|-
|| British Aerospace Harrier II || UK ||  || Attack || 1985 || Operational ||  || 
|-
|| CAC Woomera || Australia ||  || Attack || 1941 || Prototype ||  || 
|-
|| CAMS 33 || France ||  || Maritime patrol flying boat || 1923 || Operational ||  || 
|-
|| CAMS 37 || France ||  || Maritime patrol flying boat || 1926 || Operational ||  ||  
|-
|| CAMS 55 || France ||  || Maritime patrol flying boat || 1928 || Operational ||  || 
|-
|| Canadair CL-41 Tebuan || Canada ||  || trainer/attack || 1960 || Operational 1986 ||  || 
|-
|| Canadair CP-107 Argus || Canada ||  || Maritime patrol || 1957 || Operational 1982 ||  || 
|-
|| CANSA FC.20bis || Italy ||  || Bomber || 1941 || Prototype ||  ca. || 
|-
|| CANT Z.1007 || Italy ||  || Heavy bomber || 1937 || Operational ||  || 
|-
|| CANT Z.1018 || Italy ||  || Medium bomber || 1939 || Prototype ||  || 
|-
|| CANT Z.501 || Italy ||  || Maritime patrol flying boat || 1934 || Operational || + || 
|-
|| CANT Z.506 || Italy ||  || Maritime patrol || 1935 || Operational || + || 
|-
|| Caproni A.P.1 || Italy ||  || Attack || 1934 || Operational ||  ca. || 
|-
|| Caproni Ca.1 || Italy ||  || Heavy bomber || 1914 || Operational ||  || 
|-
|| Caproni Ca.101 || Italy ||  || Bomber/transport || 1928 || Operational ||  || 
|-
|| Caproni Ca.111 || Italy ||  || Reconnaissance bomber || 1932 || Operational ||  || 
|-
|| Caproni Ca.2 || Italy ||  || Heavy bomber || 1915 || Operational ||  || 
|-
|| Caproni Ca.3 || Italy ||  || Heavy bomber || 1916 || Operational ||  || 
|-
|| Caproni Ca.310 || Italy ||  || Reconnaissance bomber || 1937 || Operational ||  || 
|-
|| Caproni Ca.311 || Italy ||  || Reconnaissance bomber || 1939 || Operational ||  || 
|-
|| Caproni Ca.313 || Italy ||  || Reconnaissance bomber || 1939 || Operational ||  || 
|-
|| Caproni Ca.314 || Italy ||  || Torpedo bomber || 1939 || Operational ||  || 
|-
|| Caproni Ca.316 || Italy ||  || Maritime patrol || 1940 || Operational ||  || 
|-
|| Caproni Ca.355 || Italy ||  || Dive bomber || 1941 || Project ||  || 
|-
|| Caproni Ca.4 || Italy ||  || Heavy bomber || 1917 || Operational ||  ||
|-
|| Caproni Ca.5 || Italy ||  || Heavy bomber || 1917 || Operational ||  || 
|-
|| Caproni Ca.73 || Italy ||  || Bomber/transport || 1924 || Operational ||  || 
|-
|| Caproni Ca.90 || Italy ||  || Heavy bomber || 1929 || Prototype ||  || 
|-
|| CASA CN-235MPA || Spain ||  || Maritime patrol || 1983 || Operational ||  || 
|-
|| Caudron G.4 || France ||  || Bomber || 1915 || Operational ||  || 
|-
|| Caudron R.4 || France ||  || Reconnaissance bomber || 1915 || Operational ||  || 
|-
|| Cessna A-37 Dragonfly || US ||  || Attack || 1963 || Operational ||  || 
|-
|| Chyetverikov ARK-3 || USSR ||  || Maritime patrol || 1936 || Prototype ||  || 
|-
|| Chyetverikov MDR-3 || USSR ||  || Maritime patrol flying boat || 1932 || Prototype ||  || 
|-
|| Chyetverikov MDR-6 || USSR ||  || Maritime patrol || 1937 || Operational ||  || 
|-
|| Consolidated B-24 Liberator || US ||  || Heavy bomber || 1939 || Operational ||  ||  
|-
|| Consolidated B-32 Dominator || US ||  || Heavy bomber || 1942 || Operational ||  || 
|-
|| Consolidated P2Y || US ||  || Maritime patrol flying boat || 1929 || Operational ||  || 
|-
|| Consolidated PB2Y Coronado || US ||  || Maritime patrol flying boat || 1937 || Operational ||  ||  
|-
|| Consolidated PB4Y-2 Privateer || US ||  || Maritime patrol || 1943 || Operational ||  || 
|-
|| Consolidated PBY Catalina || US ||  || Maritime patrol flying boat/amphibian || 1935 || Operationals ||  ca. || 
|-
|| Vought TBU/Consolidated TBY Sea Wolf || US ||  || Torpedo bomber || 1941 || Operational ||  || 
|-
|| Consolidated XP4Y Corregidor || US ||  || Maritime patrol flying boat || 1939 || Prototype ||  || 
|-
|| Convair B-36 || US ||  || Heavy bomber || 1946 || Operational ||  || 
|-
|| Convair B-58 Hustler || US ||  || Heavy bomber || 1956 || Operational ||  || 
|-
|| Convair XB-46 || US ||  || Heavy bomber || 1947 || Prototype ||  || 
|-
|| Convair YB-60 || US ||  || Heavy bomber || 1952 || Prototype ||  || 
|-
|| Curtiss A-12 Shrike || US ||  || Attack || 1933 || Operational ||  || 
|-
|| Curtiss A-18 Shrike || US ||  || Attack || 1935 || Operational ||  || 
|-
|| Curtiss A-8 || US ||  || Attack || 1931 || Operational ||  || 
|-
|| Curtiss B-2 Condor || US ||  || Heavy bomber || 1929 || Operational ||  || 
|-
|| Curtiss BF2C Goshawk || US ||  || Fighter bomber || 1933 || Operational ||  || 
|-
|| Curtiss CS || US ||  || Torpedo bomber || 1923 || Operational ||  || 
|-
|| Curtiss F5L || US ||  || Maritime patrol flying boat || 1918 || Operational ||  || 
|-
|| Curtiss A-3/A-4 Falcon || US ||  || Attack || 1924 || Operational ||  || 
|-
|| Curtiss HS || US ||  || Maritime patrol flying boat || 1917 || Operational ||  || 
|-
|| Curtiss Model H || US ||  || Maritime patrol flying boat || 1917 || Operational ||  || 
|-
|| Curtiss SB2C Helldiver/A-25 Shrike || US ||  || Dive bomber || 1940 || Operational ||  || 
|-
|| Curtiss SBC Helldiver || US ||  || Dive bomber || 1935 || Operational ||  || 
|-
|| Curtiss T-32 Condor II || US ||  || Bomber/transport || 1933 || Operational ||  || 
|-
|| Curtiss XA-14 || US ||  || Attack || 1935 || Prototype ||  || 
|-
|| Curtiss XBTC || US ||  || Torpedo bomber || 1945 || Prototype ||  || 
|-
|| Curtiss XSB3C || US ||  || Dive bomber || 1941 || Project ||  || 
|-
|| Curtiss YA-10 Shrike || US ||  || Attack || 1932 || Prototype ||  || 
|-
|| DAR 10 || Bulgaria ||  || Reconnaissance bomber || 1941 || Prototype ||  || 
|-
|| Dassault Mirage 2000N/2000D || France ||  || nuclear strike/strike || 1986 || Operational ||  || 
|-
|| Dassault Mirage IV || France ||  || Heavy bomber || 1959 || Operational 2005 ||  || 
|-
|| Dassault Ouragan || France ||  || Fighter bomber || 1949 || Operational ||  || 
|-
|| Dassault-Breguet Super Étendard || France ||  || Attack || 1974 || Operational ||  || 
|-
|| Dassault/Dornier Alpha Jet || France/Germany ||  || Attack || 1973 || Operational 1997 ||  ||  
|-
|| De Havilland DH.100 Vampire || UK ||  || Fighter bomber || 1943 || Operational ||  ||  
|-
|| de Havilland DH.14 Okapi || UK ||  || Heavy bomber || 1919 || Prototype ||  || 
|-
|| de Havilland DH.27 Derby || UK ||  || Heavy bomber || 1922 || Prototype ||  || 
|-
|| de Havilland DH.65 Hound || UK ||  || Reconnaissance bomber || 1926 || Prototype ||  ||  
|-
|| de Havilland DH.72 || UK ||  || Night bomber || 1931 || Prototype ||  || 
|-
|| De Havilland DH.98 Mosquito || UK ||  || Fighter bomber || 1940 || Operationals ||  ||  
|-
|| de Havilland Venom || UK ||  || Fighter bomber || 1949 || Operational ||  ||  
|-
|| DFW R.I || Germany ||  || Heavy bomber || 1916 || Prototype ||  || 
|-
|| DFW R.II || Germany ||  || Heavy bomber || 1918 || Prototype ||  || 
|-
|| DFW R.III || Germany ||  || Heavy bomber || n/a || cancelled project ||  || 
|-
|| Dornier Do P || Germany ||  || Heavy bomber || 1930 || Prototype ||  || 
|-
|| Dornier Do Y || Germany ||  || Bomber || 1931 || Operational ||  || 
|-
|| Dornier Do 11 || Germany ||  || Heavy bomber || 1932 || Operational ||  || 
|-
|| Dornier Do 17 || Germany ||  || Bomber || 1934 || Operational ||  || 
|-
|| Dornier Do 19 || Germany ||  || Heavy Bomber || 1936 || Prototype ||  || 
|-
|| Dornier Do 215 || Germany ||  || Medium bomber || 1938 || Operational ||  || 
|-
|| Dornier Do 217 || Germany ||  || Heavy bomber || 1938 || Operational ||  ||  
|-
|| Dornier Do 22 || Germany ||  || Torpedo bomber || 1935 || Operational ||  ca. || 
|-
|| Dornier 228 || Germany ||  || Maritime patrol || 1981 || Operational ||  ||  
|-
|| Dornier Do 23 || Germany ||  || Heavy bomber || 1934 || Operational ||  || 
|-
|| Dornier Do 24 || Germany ||  || Maritime patrol || 1937 || Operational ||  || 
|-
|| Dornier Do 28 || Germany ||  || Maritime patrol || 1959 || Operational ||  || 
|-
|| Dornier Do 317 || Germany ||  || Medium bomber || 1943 || Prototype ||  ||
|-
|| Douglas A-1 Skyraider || US ||  || Attack || 1945 || Operational ||  || 
|-
|| Douglas A-20 Havoc || US ||  || Attack || 1939 || Operational ||  ||  
|-
|| Douglas A-26 Invader || US ||  || Attack || 1942 || Operational ||  || 
|-
|| Douglas A-3 Skywarrior || US ||  || Heavy bomber || 1956 || Operational ||  || 
|-
|| Douglas A-4 Skyhawk || US ||  || Attack aircraft || 1954 || Operational ||  || 
|-
|| Douglas A2D Skyshark || US ||  || Attack || 1950 || Prototype ||  || 
|-
|| Douglas B-18 Bolo || US ||  || Maritime patrol/medium bomber || 1935 || Operational ||  || 
|-
|| Douglas B-23 Dragon || US ||  || Bomber/transport || 1939 || Operational ||  ||  
|-
|| Douglas B-66 Destroyer || US ||  || Medium bomber || 1954 || Operational ||  || 
|-
|| Douglas BTD Destroyer || US ||  || Torpedo/dive bomber || 1943 || Operational ||  || 
|-
|| Douglas DT || US ||  || Torpedo bomber || 1921 || Operational ||  || 
|-
|| Douglas SBD Dauntless || US ||  || Dive bomber || 1940 || Operational ||  || 
|-
|| Douglas TBD Devastator || US ||  || Torpedo bomber || 1935 || Operational ||  || 
|-
|| Douglas XB-19 || US ||  || Heavy bomber || 1941 || Prototype ||  || 
|-
|| Douglas XB-22 || US ||  || Medium bomber || n/a || Project ||  || 
|-
|| Douglas XTB2D Skypirate || US ||  || Torpedo bomber || 1945 || Prototype ||  || 
|-
|| Douglas Y1B-7 || US ||  || Heavy bomber || 1931 || Prototype ||  || 
|-
|| EADS-CASA C295MP || Spain ||  || Maritime patrol || 1997 || Operational ||  ||  
|-
|| Embraer EMB 312 Tucano || Brazil ||  || trainer/attack || 1980 || Operational ||  || 
|-
|| Embraer EMB 314 Super Tucano || Brazil ||  || trainer/attack || 1999 || Operational ||  || 
|-
|| English Electric Canberra || UK ||  || Reconnaissance bomber || 1949 || Operational ||  || 
|-
|| Fairchild Republic A-10 Thunderbolt II || US ||  || Attack || 1972 || Operational ||  || 
|-
|| Fairey Albacore || UK ||  || Torpedo bomber || 1938 || Operational ||  || 
|-
|| Fairey Barracuda || UK ||  || Torpedo/dive bomber || 1940 || Operationals ||  || 
|-
|| Fairey Battle || UK ||  || Medium bomber || 1936 || Operational ||  || 
|-
|| Fairey Campania || UK ||  || Maritime patrol || 1917 || Operational ||  || 
|-
|| Fairey Fawn || UK ||  || Reconnaissance bomber || 1923 || Operational ||  || 
|-
|| Fairey Ferret || UK ||  || Reconnaissance bomber || 1925 || Prototype ||  || 
|-
|| Fairey Fox || UK ||  || Reconnaissance bomber || 1925 || Operational ||  || 
|-
|| Fairey G.4/31 || UK ||  || Bomber || 1934 || Prototype ||  || 
|-
|| Fairey Gannet || UK ||  || Maritime patrol || 1949 || Operational 1978 ||  || 
|-
|| Fairey Gordon || UK ||  || Reconnaissance bomber || 1931 || Operational ||  || 
|-
|| Fairey Hendon || UK ||  || Heavy bomber || 1930 || Operational ||  || 
|-
|| Fairey III || UK ||  || Reconnaissance bomber || 1917 || Operational ||  || 
|-
|| Fairey P.4/34 || UK ||  || Reconnaissance bomber || 1937 || Prototype ||  || 
|-
|| Fairey Seal || UK ||  || Reconnaissance bomber || 1930 || Operational ||  || 
|-
|| Fairey Swordfish || UK ||  || Torpedo bomber || 1934 || Operational ||  || 
|-
|| Farman F.140 Super Goliath || France ||  || Night bomber || 1924 || Operational ||  || 
|-
|| Farman F.150 || France ||  || Heavy bomber || 1926 || Prototype || + || 
|-
|| Farman F.160 || France ||  || Heavy bomber || 1928 || Operational ||  || 
|-
|| Farman F.220 || France ||  || Heavy bomber || 1932 || Operational ||  ca. ||  
|-
|| Farman F.50 || France ||  || Night bomber || 1918 || Operational || + || 
|-
|| Farman F.60 Goliath || France ||  || Heavy bomber || 1919 || Prototype ||  || 
|-
|| Felixstowe F.2 || UK ||  || Maritime patrol flying boat || 1917 || Operational ||  || 
|-
|| Felixstowe F.3 || UK ||  || Maritime patrol flying boat || 1917 || Operational ||  || 
|-
|| Felixstowe F.5 || UK ||  || Maritime patrol flying boat || 1918 || Operational ||  || 
|-
|| Felixstowe Fury || UK ||  || Maritime patrol flying boat || 1918 || Prototype ||  || 
|-
|| Fiat Br.20 || Italy ||  || Medium bomber || 1936 || Operational || + || 
|-
|| Fiat BR || Italy ||  || Bomber || 1919 || Operational || + || 
|-
|| Fiat BRG || Italy ||  || Bomber || 1931 || Prototype ||  || 
|-
|| Fiat G.91 || Italy ||  || Attack || 1956 || Operational 1995 ||  || 
|-
|| Fiat G.91Y || Italy ||  || Attack || 1966 || Operational 1998 ||  || 
|-
|| Fiat RS.14 || Italy ||  || Maritime patrol || 1939 || Operational ||  || 
|-
|| Fieseler Fi 167 || Germany ||  || Torpedo bomber || 1937 || Operational ||  || 
|-
|| Fieseler Fi 98 || Germany ||  || Dive bomber || 1935 || Prototype ||  || 
|-
|| FMA AeMB.2 || Argentina ||  || Reconnaissance bomber || 1935 || Operational ||  || 
|-
|| FMA IA 58 Pucará || Argentina ||  || Attack || 1969 || Operational || + || 
|-
|| Focke-Wulf Fw 200 Condor || Germany ||  || Maritime patrol/transport || 1937 || Operational ||  ||  
|-
|| Focke-Wulf Fw 300 || Germany ||  || Heavy bomber || 1941 || Project ||  || 
|-
|| Focke-Wulf Fw 42 || Germany ||  || Medium bomber || n/a || Project ||  || 
|-
|| Focke-Wulf Ta 400 || Germany ||  || Heavy bomber || 1943 || Project ||  || 
|-
|| Fokker C.V || Netherlands ||  || Reconnaissance bomber || 1924 || Operational ||  || 
|-
|| Fokker C.X || Netherlands ||  || Reconnaissance bomber || 1934 || Operational ||  || 
|-
|| Fokker F-27 maritime || Netherlands ||  || Maritime patrol || 1955 || Operational ||  || 
|-
|| Fokker K.I || Germany ||  || Bomber || 1915 || Prototype ||  || 
|-
|| Fokker T.IV || Netherlands ||  || Maritime patrol torpedo bomber || 1927 || Operational ||  || 
|-
|| Fokker T.V || Netherlands ||  || Torpedo bomber || 1937 || Operational ||  || 
|-
|| Fokker T.VIII || Netherlands ||  || Torpedo bomber || 1938 || Operational ||  || 
|-
|| Fokker XB-8 || US ||  || Heavy bomber || 1929 || Prototype ||  || 
|-
|| Fouga CM.170 Magister || France ||  || trainer/attack || 1952 || Operational ||  || 
|-
|| Friedrichshafen FF.41 || Germany ||  || Reconnaissance bomber || 1917 || Operational ||  || 
|-
|| Friedrichshafen G.I || Germany ||  || Heavy bomber || 1915 || Prototype ||  || 
|-
|| Friedrichshafen G.II || Germany ||  || Heavy bomber || 1916 || Operational ||  || 
|-
|| Friedrichshafen G.III || Germany ||  || Heavy bomber || 1917 || Operational ||  || 
|-
|| Friedrichshafen G.IV || Germany ||  || Heavy bomber || 1918 || Prototype ||  || 
|-
|| Friedrichshafen G.V || Germany ||  || Heavy bomber || 1918 || Prototype ||  || 
|-
|| General Dynamics F-111 || US ||  || Bomber || 1967 || Operational 2010 ||  || 
|-
|| Gloster Goral || UK ||  || Reconnaissance bomber || 1927 || Prototype ||  || 
|-
|| Gloster TSR.38 || UK ||  || Torpedo bomber || 1932 || Prototype ||  || 
|-
|| Gotha G.I || Germany ||  || Heavy bomber || 1915 || Operational ||  || 
|-
|| Gotha G.II || Germany ||  || Heavy bomber || 1916 || Operational ||  || 
|-
|| Gotha G.III || Germany ||  || Heavy bomber || 1916 || Operational ||  || 
|-
|| Gotha G.IV || Germany ||  || Heavy bomber || 1916 || Operational ||  || 
|-
|| Gotha G.IX || Germany ||  || Heavy bomber || 1918 || Operational ||  ca. || 
|-
|| Gotha G.V || Germany ||  || Heavy bomber || 1917 || Operational ||  || 
|-
|| Gotha G.VI || Germany ||  || Heavy bomber || 1918 || Prototype ||  || 
|-
|| Gotha GL.VII || Germany ||  || Medium bomber || 1918 || Operational ||  ca. || 
|-
|| Gotha G.VIII || Germany ||  || Heavy bomber || 1918 || Prototype ||  || 
|-
|| Gotha G.X || Germany ||  || Heavy bomber || 1918 || Prototype ||  || 
|-
|| Grahame-White Ganymede || UK ||  || Heavy bomber || 1919 || Prototype ||  || 
|-
|| Great Lakes BG || US ||  || Dive bomber || 1933 || Operational ||  || 
|-
|| Grigorovich TB-5 || USSR ||  || Heavy bomber || 1931 || Prototype ||  || 
|-
|| Grumman A-6 Intruder || US ||  || Attack || 1960 || Operational 1997 ||  || 
|-
|| Grumman AF Guardian || US ||  || Maritime patrol || 1945 || Operational ||  ||  
|-
|| Grumman F9F Panther || US ||  || Fighter bomber || 1947 || Operational ||  || 
|-
|| Grumman OV-1 Mohawk || US ||  || Reconnaissance bomber || 1959 || Operational ||  || 
|-
|| Grumman S-2 Tracker || US ||  || Maritime patrol || 1952 || Operational ||  || 
|-
|| Grumman TBF Avenger || US ||  || Torpedo bomber || 1941 || Operational ||  || 
|-
|| Grumman XTB2F || US ||  || Torpedo bomber || 1944 || Project ||  || 
|-
|| HAL HF-24 Marut || India ||  || Fighter bomber || 1961 || Operational ||  || 
|-
|| HAL HJT-16 Kiran || India ||  || trainer/attack || 1964 || Operational ||  || 
|-
|| Hall XPTBH || US ||  || Torpedo bomber || 1937 || Prototype ||  || 
|-
|| Handley Page H.P.19 Hanley || UK ||  || Torpedo bomber || 1922 || Prototype ||  || 
|-
|| Handley Page H.P.24 Hyderabad || UK ||  || Heavy bomber || 1925 || Operational ||  || 
|-
|| Handley Page H.P.25 Hendon || UK ||  || Torpedo bomber || 1924 || Prototype ||  || 
|-
|| Handley Page H.P.28 Handcross || UK ||  || Heavy bomber || 1924 || Prototype ||  || 
|-
|| Handley Page H.P.31 Harrow || UK ||  || Torpedo bomber || 1926 || Prototype ||  || 
|-
|| Handley Page H.P.33 Hinaidi || UK ||  || Heavy bomber || 1927 || Operational ||  || 
|-
|| Handley Page H.P.34 Hare || UK ||  || Bomber || 1928 || Prototype ||  || 
|-
|| Handley Page H.P.43 || UK ||  || Bomber/transport || 1932 || Prototype ||  || 
|-
|| Handley Page H.P.46 || UK ||  || Torpedo bomber || 1932 || Prototype ||  || 
|-
|| Handley Page H.P.47 || UK ||  || Torpedo bomber || 1934 || Prototype ||  || 
|-
|| Handley Page H.P.50 Heyford || UK ||  || Heavy bomber || 1930 || Operational ||  || 
|-
|| Handley Page H.P.51 || UK ||  || Bomber/transport || 1935 || Prototype ||  || 
|-
|| Handley Page Harrow || UK ||  || Bomber/transport || 1936 || Operational ||  ||  
|-
|| Handley Page Halifax || UK ||  || Heavy bomber || 1939 || Operational ||  ||  
|-
|| Handley Page Hampden/Hereford || UK ||  || Medium bomber || 1936 || Operational ||  || 
|-
|| Handley Page Type O || UK ||  || Heavy bomber || 1915 || Operational ||  || 
|-
|| Handley Page V/1500 || UK ||  || Heavy bomber || 1918 || Operational ||  || 
|-
|| Handley Page Victor || UK || Jet || Heavy bomber || 1952 || Operational ||  || 
|-
|| Harbin H-5 || USSR/China ||  || Medium bomber || 1948 || Operational || + || 
|-
|| Harbin H-7 || China ||  || Medium bomber || 1965 || Project ||  || 
|-
|| Harbin SH-5 || China ||  || Maritime patrol flying boat || 1976 || Operational ||  || 
|-
|| Hawker Audax || UK ||  || Reconnaissance bomber || 1931 || Operational || + || 
|-
|| Hawker Dantorp || UK ||  || Torpedo bomber || 1932 || Operational ||  || 
|-
|| Hawker Hardy || UK ||  || Reconnaissance bomber || 1934 || Operational ||  || 
|-
|| Hawker Hart || UK ||  || Reconnaissance bomber || 1928 || Operational ||  || 
|-
|| Hawker Hector || UK ||  || Reconnaissance bomber || 1936 || Operational ||  || 
|-
|| Hawker Henley || UK ||  || Reconnaissance bomber || 1937 || Operational ||  || 
|-
|| Hawker Hind || UK ||  || Reconnaissance bomber || 1934 || Operational ||  || 
|-
|| Hawker Horsley || UK ||  || Torpedo bomber || 1925 || Operational ||  || 
|-
|| Hawker Hunter || UK ||  || Fighter bomber || 1951 || Operational ||  ||  
|-
|| Hawker Siddeley Harrier || UK ||  || Attack || 1974 || Operational ||  || 
|-
|| Hawker Typhoon || UK ||  || Fighter bomber || 1940 || Operational ||  || 
|-
|| Hawker-Siddeley Hawk || UK ||  || Attack || 1974 || Operational || + ||  
|-
|| Hawker-Siddeley Nimrod || UK ||  || Maritime patrol || 1967 || Operational ||  || 
|-
|| Heinkel He 111 || Germany ||  || Heavy bomber || 1935 || Operational ||  ||  
|-
|| Heinkel He 115 || Germany ||  || Maritime patrol || 1937 || Operational ||  || 
|-
|| Heinkel He 177 || Germany ||  || Heavy bomber || 1939 || Operational ||  || 
|-
|| Heinkel He 274 || Germany ||  || Heavy bomber || 1945 || Prototype ||  || 
|-
|| Heinkel He 277 || Germany ||  || Heavy bomber || 1943 || Project ||  || 
|-
|| Heinkel He 45 || Germany ||  || Reconnaissance bomber || 1931 || Operational ||  || 
|-
|| Heinkel He 50 || Germany ||  || Dive bomber || 1931 || Operational ||  || 
|-
|| Heinkel He 59 || Germany ||  || Torpedo bomber || 1931 || Operational ||  || 
|-
|| Heinkel He 70 || Germany ||  || Medium bomber || 1932 || Operational ||  ||  
|-
|| Henschel Hs 123 || Germany ||  || Dive bomber || 1935 || Operational ||  ca. || 
|-
|| Henschel Hs 129 || Germany ||  || Attack || 1939 || Operational ||  || 
|-
|| Hiro G2H || Japan ||  || Heavy bomber || 1933 || Operational ||  || 
|-
|| Hiro H1H || Japan ||  || Maritime patrol flying boat || 1927 || Operational ||  || 
|-
|| Hiro H2H || Japan ||  || Maritime patrol flying boat || 1930 || Operational ||  || 
|-
|| Hiro H4H || Japan ||  || Maritime patrol flying boat || 1931 || Operational ||  || 
|-
|| Hispano HA-200 || Spain ||  || Attack || 1955 || Operational ||  ||  
|-
|| Huff-Daland XB-1 || US ||  || Heavy bomber || 1927 || Prototype ||  || 
|-
|| I.Ae. 24 Calquin || Argentina ||  || Bomber || 1946 || Operational ||  || 
|-
|| Ilyushin DB-3 || USSR ||  || Heavy bomber || 1935 || Operational ||  || 
|-
|| Ilyushin Il-10 & Avia B-33 || USSR ||  || Attack || 1944 || Operational ||  || 
|-
|| Ilyushin Il-102 || USSR ||  || Attack || 1982 || Prototype ||  || 
|-
|| Ilyushin Il-2 || USSR ||  || Attack || 1939 || Operational ||  || 
|-
|| Ilyushin Il-28 || USSR ||  || Medium bomber || 1948 || Operational ||  || 
|-
|| Ilyushin Il-38 || USSR ||  || Maritime patrol || 1967 || Operational ||  || 
|-
|| Ilyushin Il-4 || USSR ||  || Medium bomber || 1936 || Operational ca. ||  || 
|-
|| Ilyushin Il-40 || USSR ||  || Attack || 1953 || Prototype ||  || 
|-
|| Ilyushin Il-54 || USSR ||  || Medium bomber || 1955 || Prototype ||  || 
|-
|| Ilyushin Il-6 || USSR ||  || Bomber || 1943 || Prototype ||  || 
|-
|| Ilyushin Il-8 || USSR ||  || Attack || 1943 || Prototype ||  || 
|-
|| Junkers A 35 || Germany ||  || Reconnaissance bomber || 1926 || Prototype ||  || 
|-
|| Junkers R 42/JuG-1 || Germany ||  || Bomber/transport || 1924 || Operational ||  || 
|-
|| Junkers Ju 188 || Germany ||  || Medium bomber || 1940 || Operational ||  || 
|-
|| Junkers Ju 287 || Germany ||  || Bomber || 1944 || Prototype ||  || 
|-
|| Junkers Ju 288 || Germany ||  || Bomber || 1940 || Prototypes ||  || 
|-
|| Junkers Ju 290 || Germany ||  || Maritime patrol/heavy bomber || 1942 || Operational ||  ||  
|-
|| Junkers Ju 388 || Germany ||  || Reconnaissance bomber || 1943 || Operational ||  ca. || 
|-
|| Junkers Ju 390 || Germany ||  || Maritime patrol/transport || 1943 || Prototype ||  || 
|-
|| Junkers Ju 488 || Germany ||  || Bomber || n/a || Prototype ||  || 
|-
|| Junkers Ju 52 || Germany ||  || Bomber/transport || 1930 || Operational 1982 ||  ||  
|-
|| Junkers Ju 86 || Germany ||  || Reconnaissance bomber || 1934 || Operational ||  ca. ||  
|-
|| Junkers Ju 87 || Germany ||  || Dive bomber || 1935 || Operational ||  ca. || 
|-
|| Junkers Ju 88 || Germany ||  || Medium bomber || 1936 || Operational ||  ca. ||  
|-
|| Junkers Ju 89 || Germany ||  || Heavy bomber || 1937 || Prototype ||  || 
|-
|| Junkers K 37 || Germany ||  || Heavy bomber || 1927 || Prototype ||  || 
|-
|| Junkers K 43 || Germany ||  || Bomber/transport || 1926 || Prototype || + ||  
|-
|| Junkers K 47 || Germany ||  || Dive bomber || 1929 || Operational ||  || 
|-
|| Kaiser-Fleetwings XBTK || US ||  || Torpedo/dive bomber || 1945 || Prototype ||  || 
|-
|| Kalinin K-7 || USSR ||  || Heavy bomber || 1933 || Prototype ||  || 
|-
|| Kawanishi E7K || Japan ||  || Reconnaissance bomber || 1933 || Operational ||  || 
|-
|| Kawanishi H6K || Japan ||  || Maritime patrol flying boat || 1936 || Operational ||  || 
|-
|| Kawanishi H8K || Japan ||  || Maritime patrol flying boat || 1941 || Operational ||  || 
|-
|| Dornier Do N || Germany ||  || Bomber || 1928 || Operational ||  || 
|-
|| Kawasaki Ki-102 || Japan ||  || Attack || 1944 || Operational ||  || 
|-
|| Kawasaki Ki-3 || Japan ||  || Reconnaissance bomber || 1933 || Operational ||  || 
|-
|| Kawasaki Ki-32 || Japan ||  || Reconnaissance bomber || 1937 || Operational ||  || 
|-
|| Kawasaki Ki-48 || Japan ||  || Reconnaissance bomber || 1939 || Operational ||  || 
|-
|| Kawasaki P-1 || Japan ||  || Maritime patrol || 2007 || Operational ||  || 
|-
|| Kennedy Giant || UK ||  || Heavy bomber || 1917 || Prototype ||  || 
|-
|| Keystone B-3 || US ||  || Reconnaissance bomber || 1929 || Operational ||  || 
|-
|| Keystone B-4 || US ||  || Heavy bomber || 1930 || Operational ||  || 
|-
|| Keystone B-5 || US ||  || Heavy bomber || 1929 || Operational ||  || 
|-
|| Keystone B-6 || US ||  || Heavy bomber || 1931 || Operational ||  || 
|-
|| Kharkov KhAI-5 || USSR ||  || Reconnaissance bomber || 1936 || Operational || + || 
|-
|| Kyushu Q1W || Japan ||  || Maritime patrol || 1943 || Operational ||  || 
|-
|| LACAB GR.8 || Belgium ||  || Heavy bomber || 1936 || Prototype ||  || 
|-
|| Latécoère 290 || France ||  || Torpedo bomber || 1931 || Operational ||  || 
|-
|| Latécoère 298 || France ||  || Torpedo bomber || 1936 || Operational ||  || 
|-
|| Latécoère 302 || France ||  || Torpedo bomber flying boat || 1931 || Prototype ||  || 
|-
|| Latécoère 381 || France ||  || Maritime patrol flying boat || 1930 || Prototype ||  || 
|-
|| Latécoère 521 & 523 || France ||  || Maritime patrol flying boat || 1935 || Prototype ||  || 
|-
|| Latécoère 550 || France ||  || Torpedo bomber || 1933 || Prototype ||  || 
|-
|| Latécoère 570 || France ||  || Medium bomber || 1939 || Prototype ||  || 
|-
|| Latécoère 582 || France ||  || Torpedo bomber || 1935 || Prototype ||  || 
|-
|| Latécoère 611 || France ||  || Maritime patrol flying boat || 1939 || Prototype ||  || 
|-
|| Letov Š-16 || Czechoslovakia ||  || Reconnaissance bomber || 1926 || Operational ||  || 
|-
|| Letov Š-28, 128, 228, 328, 428 & 528 || Czechoslovakia ||  || Reconnaissance bomber || 1929 || Operational ||  || 
|-
|| Letov Š-33 || Czechoslovakia ||  || Reconnaissance bomber || 1930 || Prototype ||  || 
|-
|| Letov Š-6 || Czechoslovakia ||  || Reconnaissance bomber || 1923 || Operational ||  || 
|-
|| Levasseur PL.107 || France ||  || Torpedo bomber || 1937 || Prototype ||  || 
|-
|| Levasseur PL.14 || France ||  || Torpedo bomber || 1929 || Operational ||  || 
|-
|| Levasseur PL.15 || France ||  || Torpedo bomber || 1932 || Operational ||  || 
|-
|| Levasseur PL.2 || France ||  || Torpedo bomber || 1922 || Operational ||  || 
|-
|| Levasseur PL.7 || France ||  || Torpedo bomber || 1928 || Operational ||  || 
|-
|| Linke-Hofmann R.I || Germany ||  || Heavy bomber || 1917 || Prototype ||  || 
|-
|| Linke-Hofmann R.II || Germany ||  || Heavy bomber || 1919 || Prototype ||  ||  
|-
|| Lioré et Olivier LeO 20 || France ||  || Night bomber || 1927 || Operational ||  ca. || 
|-
|| Lioré et Olivier LeO 25 || France ||  || Heavy bomber || 1928 || Operational ||  || 
|-
|| Lioré et Olivier LeO 45 || France ||  || Medium bomber || 1937 || Operational ||  || 
|-
|| Lioré et Olivier LeO H-13 || France ||  || Night bomber || 1922 || Operational ||  || 
|-
|| Lockheed F-117 Nighthawk || US ||  || Bomber (stealth) || 1981 || Operational ||  || 
|-
|| Lockheed Hudson || US ||  || Maritime patrol || 1938 || Operational ||  || 
|-
|| Lockheed P-3 Orion/CP-140 Aurora/Arcturus || US ||  || Maritime patrol || 1959 || Operational ||  || 
|-
|| Lockheed P2V Neptune || US ||  || Maritime patrol || 1945 || Operational ||  || 
|-
|| Lockheed S-3 Viking || US ||  || Maritime patrol || 1972 || Operational ||  || 
|-
|| Lockheed Ventura/Harpoon || US ||  || Maritime patrol || 1941 || Operational ||  ||  
|-
|| Lockheed XB-30 || US ||  || Heavy bomber - project || n/a || Project ||  || 
|-
|| Loire 70 || France ||  || Maritime patrol flying boat || 1933 || Operational ||  || 
|-
|| LTV A-7 Corsair II || US ||  || Attack || 1965 || Operational ||  || 
|-
|| LWS-6 Zubr || Poland ||  || Medium bomber || 1936 || Operational ||  || 
|-
|| Macchi M.C.99 || Italy ||  || Maritime patrol || 1937 || Prototype ||  || 
|-
|| Martin AM Mauler || US ||  || Attack || 1944 || Operational ||  || 
|-
|| Martin B-10 & related || US ||  || Heavy bomber || 1932 || Operational ||  || 
|-
|| Martin B-26 Marauder || US ||  || Medium bomber || 1940 || Operational ||  || 
|-
|| Martin B-57 Canberra || US ||  || Reconnaissance bomber || 1953 || Operational ||  ||  
|-
|| Martin Baltimore || US ||  || Medium bomber || 1941 || Operational ||  || 
|-
|| Martin Maryland || US ||  || Medium bomber || 1939 || Operational ||  || 
|-
|| Martin MBT/MT || US ||  || Bomber || 1918 || Operational ||  || 
|-
|| Martin NBS-1 || US ||  || Night bomber || 1920 || Operational ||  || 
|-
|| Martin P4M Mercator || US ||  || Maritime patrol || 1946 || Operational ||  || 
|-
|| Martin P5M Marlin || US ||  || Maritime patrol || 1948 || Operational ||  || 
|-
|| Martin P6M SeaMaster || US || Jet || Heavy bomber || 1955 || Operational ||  || Flying boat.
|-
|| Martin PBM Mariner || US ||  || Maritime patrol || 1939 || Operational ||  || 
|-
|| Martin T3M || US ||  || Torpedo bomber || 1926 || Operational ||  || 
|-
|| Martin T4M || US ||  || Torpedo bomber || 1927 || Operational ||  || 
|-
|| Martin XB-27 || US ||  || Heavy bomber || n/a || Project ||  || 
|-
|| Martin XB-33 Super Marauder || US ||  || Heavy bomber || n/a || Project ||  || 
|-
|| Martin XB-48 || US ||  || Medium bomber || 1947 || Prototype ||  || 
|-
|| Martin XB-51 || US ||  || Attack || 1949 || Prototype ||  || 
|-
|| Martinsyde G.100 and 102 Elephant || UK ||  || Reconnaissance bomber || 1915 || Operational ||  || 
|-
|| McDonnell Douglas A-12 Avenger II || US ||  || Attack || 1983 || Project ||  || 
|-
|| McDonnell Douglas AV-8B Harrier II || US ||  || Attack || 1978 || Operational ||  || 
|-
|| McDonnell Douglas F-4 Phantom II || US ||  || Fighter bomber || 1958 || Operational ||  ||  
|-
|| McDonnell Douglas F/A-18 Hornet || US ||  || Fighter bomber || 1978 || Operational ||  || 
|-
|| Messerschmitt Me 262 || Germany ||  || Fighter bomber || 1942 || Operational ||  || 
|-
|| Messerschmitt Me 264 || Germany ||  || Maritime patrol/heavy bomber || 1942 || Prototype ||  || 
|-
|| Mikoyan MiG-27 || USSR ||  || Attack || 1970 || Operational ||  || 
|-
|| Mitsubishi 1MT || Japan ||  || Torpedo bomber || 1922 || Operational ||  || 
|-
|| Mitsubishi 2MB1 || Japan ||  || Reconnaissance bomber || 1926 || Operational ||  || 
|-
|| Mitsubishi 3MT5 || Japan ||  || Torpedo bomber || 1932 || Operational ||  || 
|-
|| Mitsubishi B1M || Japan ||  || Torpedo bomber || 1923 || Operational ||  || 
|-
|| Mitsubishi B2M || Japan ||  || Torpedo bomber || 1929 || Operational ||  || 
|-
|| Mitsubishi B5M || Japan ||  || Torpedo bomber || 1937 || Operational ||  ca. || 
|-
|| Mitsubishi G1M || Japan ||  || Heavy bomber || 1934 || Prototype ||  || 
|-
|| Mitsubishi G3M || Japan ||  || Attack || 1935 || Operational ||  || 
|-
|| Mitsubishi G4M || Japan ||  || Heavy bomber || 1939 || Operational ||  ||  
|-
|| Mitsubishi Ki-1 || Japan ||  || Heavy bomber || 1932 || Operational ||  || 
|-
|| Mitsubishi Ki-2 || Japan ||  || Heavy bomber || 1933 || Operational ||  || 
|-
|| Mitsubishi Ki-20 || Japan ||  || Heavy bomber || 1932 || Operational ||  || 
|-
|| Mitsubishi Ki-21 || Japan ||  || Heavy bomber || 1936 || Operational ||  || 
|-
|| Mitsubishi Ki-30 || Japan ||  || Reconnaissance bomber || 1937 || Operational ||  || 
|-
|| Mitsubishi Ki-51 || Japan ||  || Dive bomber || 1939 || Operational ||  || 
|-
|| Mitsubishi Ki-67 || Japan ||  || Heavy bomber || 1941 || Operational ||  || 
|-
|| Morane-Saulnier Epervier || France ||  || Attack || 1958 || Prototype ||  || 
|-
|| Morane-Saulnier S || France ||  || Heavy bomber || 1915 || Prototype ||  || 
|-
|| Morane-Saulnier T || France ||  || Heavy bomber || 1916 || Operational ||  || 
|-
|| Morane-Saulnier TRK || France ||  || Heavy bomber || 1916 || Prototype ||  || 
|-
|| Myasishchev M-4 || USSR ||  || Heavy bomber || 1953 || Operational ||  || 
|-
|| Myasishchev M-50 || USSR ||  || Heavy bomber || 1959 || Prototype ||  || 
|-
|| Nakajima B5N || Japan ||  || Torpedo bomber || 1937 || Operational ||  ca. || 
|-
|| Nakajima B6N || Japan ||  || Torpedo bomber || 1941 || Operational ||  || 
|-
|| Nakajima E4N || Japan ||  || Reconnaissance bomber || 1930 || Operational ||  || 
|-
|| Nakajima E8N || Japan ||  || Reconnaissance bomber || 1934 || Operational ||  || 
|-
|| Nakajima G10N || Japan ||  || Heavy bomber || 1943 || Project ||  || 
|-
|| Nakajima G5N || Japan ||  || Heavy bomber || 1941 || Prototype ||  || 
|-
|| Nakajima G8N || Japan ||  || Heavy bomber || 1944 || Prototype ||  || 
|-
|| Nakajima Ki-19 || Japan ||  || Heavy bomber || 1937 || Prototype ||  || 
|-
|| Nakajima Ki-4 || Japan ||  || Reconnaissance bomber || 1933 || Operational ||  || 
|-
|| Nakajima Ki-49 || Japan ||  || Heavy bomber || 1939 || Operational ||  || 
|-
|| Nakajima LB-2 || Japan ||  || Heavy bomber || 1936 || Prototype ||  || 
|-
|| Nanchang Q-5 || China ||  || Attack || 1965 || Operational ||  || 
|-
|| Nanchang Q-6 || China ||  || Attack || 1979 || Project ||  || 
|-
|| Naval Aircraft Factory SBN || US ||  || Dive bomber || 1936 || Operational ||  || 
|-
|| Nieuport 15 || France ||  || Heavy bomber || 1916 || Prototype ||  || 
|-
|| Nieuport 18 and 19 || France ||  || Heavy bomber || n/a || cancelled project ||  || 
|-
|| Nieuport London || UK ||  || Night bomber || 1920 || Prototype ||  || 
|-
|| Nieuport-Delage NiD 30B || France ||  || Heavy bomber || n/a || Project ||  ||  
|-
|| Norman Thompson N.T.4 || UK ||  || Maritime patrol flying boat || 1916 || Operational ||  || 
|-
|| North American A-27 || US ||  || Attack || 1940 || Operational ||  || 
|-
|| North American A-5 Vigilante || US ||  || Reconnaissance bomber || 1958 || Operational ||  || 
|-
|| North American AJ/A-2 Savage || US ||  || Heavy bomber || 1948 || Operational ||  || 
|-
|| North American B-25 Mitchell || US ||  || Medium bomber || 1940 || Operational ||  || 
|-
|| North American B-45 Tornado || US ||  || Reconnaissance bomber || 1947 || Operational ||  || 
|-
|| North American Rockwell OV-10 Bronco || US ||  || Reconnaissance bomber || 1965 || Operational ||  || 
|-
|| North American T-28 Trojan || US ||  || trainer/attack || 1949 || Operational ||  || 
|-
|| North American T-6 Texan || US ||  || Attack || 1940 || Operational ||  ||  
|-
|| North American XA2J Super Savage || US ||  || Bomber || 1952 || Prototype ||  || 
|-
|| North American XB-21 || US ||  || Medium bomber || 1936 || Prototype ||  || 
|-
|| North American XB-28 || US ||  || Medium bomber || 1942 || Prototype ||  || 
|-
|| North American XB-70 Valkyrie || US || Jet || Heavy bomber || 1964 || Prototype ||  || 
|-
|| Northrop A-17 || US ||  || Reconnaissance bomber || 1935 || Operational ||  || 
|-
|| Northrop BT || US ||  || Dive bomber || 1935 || Operational ||  || 
|-
|| Northrop Grumman B-2 Spirit || US || Jet || Bomber (stealth) || 1989 || Operational ||  || 
|-
|| Northrop N-3PB || US ||  || Maritime patrol bomber || 1940 || Operational ||  || 
|-
|| Northrop YA-9 || US ||  || Attack || 1972 || Prototype ||  ||  
|-
|| Northrop YB-35 || US ||  || Heavy bomber || 1946 || Prototype ||  || Flying wing.
|-
|| Northrop YB-49 || US || Jet || Heavy bomber || 1947 || Prototype ||  || Flying wing.
|-
|| OKB-1 140 || USSR ||  || Bomber || 1948 || Prototype ||  || 
|-
|| OKB-1 EF 131 || USSR ||  || Bomber || 1947 || Prototype ||  || 
|-
|| PAK DA || Russia ||  || Attack || n/a || project ||  || 
|-
|| Panavia Tornado || Germany/Italy/UK || Jet || Fighter bomber || 1974 || Operational ||  ||  
|-
|| Parnall G.4/31 || UK ||  || Reconnaissance bomber || 1935 || Prototype ||  || 
|-
|| Parnall Pike || UK ||  || Reconnaissance bomber || 1927 || Prototype ||  || 
|-
|| Parnall Possum || UK ||  || Heavy bomber || 1923 || Prototype ||  || 
|-
|| Paul Schmitt PS.6 || France ||  || Reconnaissance bomber || 1914 || Operational ||  ca. || 
|-
|| Paul Schmitt PS.7 || France ||  || Reconnaissance bomber || 1915 || Operational ||  ca. || 
|-
|| Percival Provost || UK ||  || trainer/attack || 1950 || Operational ||  ||  
|-
|| Petlyakov Pe-2 || USSR ||  || Dive bomber || 1939 || Operational ||  || 
|-
|| Petlyakov Pe-8 || USSR ||  || Heavy bomber || 1936 || Operationals ||  || 
|-
|| Piaggio P.108 || Italy ||  || Heavy bomber || 1939 || Operational ||  ca. || 
|-
|| Piaggio P.133 || Italy ||  || Heavy bomber || 1943 || Project ||  || 
|-
|| Piper PA-48 Enforcer || US ||  || Attack || 1971 || Prototype ||  || 
|-
|| Polikarpov R-5 || USSR ||  || Reconnaissance bomber || 1928 || Operational || + || 
|-
|| Polikarpov R-Z || USSR ||  || Reconnaissance bomber || 1935 || Operational ||  || 
|-
|| Polikarpov TB-2 || USSR ||  || Heavy bomber || 1930 || Prototype ||  || 
|-
|| Potez 15 || France ||  || Reconnaissance bomber || 1921 || Operational ||  || 
|-
|| Potez 25 || France ||  || Reconnaissance bomber || 1924 || Operational ||  ca. || 
|-
|| Potez 540 || France ||  || Reconnaissance bomber || 1933 || Operational ||  || 
|-
|| Potez 633 || France ||  || Reconnaissance bomber || 1937 || Operational ||  ca. || 
|-
|| PZL I-22 Iryda || Poland ||  || trainer/attack || 1985 || Operational ||  || 
|-
|| PZL.23 Karaś || Poland ||  || Reconnaissance bomber || 1936 || Operational ||  || 
|-
|| PZL.37 Los || Poland ||  || Medium bomber || 1936 || Operational || + || 
|-
|| PZL.43 Karaś || Poland ||  || Reconnaissance bomber || 1937 || Operational ||  || 
|-
|| Republic AP-100 || US ||  || Strike fighter || (1957) || Project ||  || 
|-
|| Republic F-105 Thunderchief || US ||  || Fighter bomber || 1955 || Operational ||  || 
|-
|| Republic F-84 Thunderjet || US ||  || Fighter bomber || 1946 || Operational ||  || 
|-
|| Republic F-84F Thunderstreak || US ||  || Fighter bomber || 1954 || Operational ||  || 
|-
|| Republic P-47 || US ||  || Fighter bomber || 1941 || Operational ||  ||  
|-
|| Rockwell B-1 Lancer || US ||  || Heavy bomber || 1974 || Operational ||  || 
|-
|| Royal Aircraft Factory B.E.2 || UK ||  || Reconnaissance bomber || 1912 || Operational ||  ca. || 
|-
|| Royal Aircraft Factory F.E.2 || UK ||  || Reconnaissance bomber || 1914 || Operational ||  || 
|-
|| Royal Aircraft Factory R.E.5 || UK ||  || Reconnaissance bomber || 1914 || Operational ||  || 
|-
|| Royal Aircraft Factory R.E.7 || UK ||  || Reconnaissance bomber || 1915 || Operational ||  || 
|-
|| Royal Aircraft Factory R.E.8 || UK ||  || Reconnaissance bomber || 1916 || Operational ||  || 
|-
|| Rumpler G.I, II & III || Germany ||  || Heavy bomber || 1915 || Operational ||  || 
|-
|| Rumpler Taube || Germany ||  || Reconnaissance bomber || 1910 || Operational || + || 
|-
|| Saab 105 || Sweden ||  || trainer/attack || 1963 || Operational ||  ||  
|-
|| Saab 17 || Sweden ||  || Dive bomber || 1940 || Operational ||  || 
|-
|| Saab 18 || Sweden ||  || Medium bomber || 1942 || Operational ||  || 
|-
|| Saab Safari || Sweden ||  || trainer/attack || 1969 || Operational ||  ca. ||  
|-
|| SAB AB-20 || France ||  || Heavy bomber || 1932 || Prototype ||  || 
|-
|| SAB AB-80 || France ||  || Bomber || 1934 || Prototype ||  || 
|-
|| Sablatnig N.I || Germany ||  || Night bomber || 1918 || Prototype ||  || 
|-
|| Saro A.33 || UK ||  || Maritime patrol flying boat || 1938 || Prototype ||  ||  
|-
|| Saro Lerwick || UK ||  || Maritime patrol flying boat || 1938 || Operational ||  || 
|-
|| Saro London || UK ||  || Maritime patrol || 1934 || Operational ||  || 
|-
|| Saunders Severn || UK ||  || Maritime patrol flying boat || 1930 || Prototype ||  || 
|-
|| Saunders Valkyrie || UK ||  || Maritime patrol flying boat || 1926 || Prototype ||  || 
|-
|| Savoia-Marchetti S.55 || Italy ||  || Maritime patrol flying boat || 1924 || Operational || + ||  
|-
|| Savoia-Marchetti S.59 || Italy ||  || Maritime patrol flying boat || 1925 || Operational || + || 
|-
|| Savoia-Marchetti SM.78 || Italy ||  || Maritime patrol flying boat || 1932 || Operational ||  || 
|-
|| Savoia-Marchetti SM.79 || Italy ||  || Heavy bomber || 1934 || Operational ||  || 
|-
|| Savoia-Marchetti SM.81 || Italy ||  || Bomber/transport || 1934 || Operational ||  || 
|-
|| Savoia-Marchetti SM.82 || Italy ||  || Bomber/transport || 1939 || Operational ||  || 
|-
|| Savoia-Marchetti SM.84 || Italy ||  || Torpedo bomber || 1940 || Operational || + || 
|-
|| SEPECAT Jaguar || UK/France ||  || Attack || 1968 || Operational ||  || 
|-
|| Shin Meiwa PS-1 || Japan ||  || Maritime patrol flying boat || 1967 || Operational ||  || 
|-
|| Short Type 166 || UK ||  || Maritime patrol || 1916 || Operational ||  || 
|-
|| Short Type 81 || UK ||  || Maritime patrol || 1913 || Operational ||  || 
|-
|| Short Bomber || UK ||  || Heavy bomber || 1915 || Operational ||  || 
|-
|| Short Empire || UK ||  || Maritime patrol/transport flying boat || 1936 || Operational ||  ||  
|-
|| Short Knuckleduster || UK ||  || Maritime patrol flying boat || 1933 || Prototype ||  || 
|-
|| Short N.2B || UK ||  || Bomber || 1917 || Prototype ||  || 
|-
|| Short Rangoon || UK ||  || Maritime patrol flying boat || 1930 || Operational ||  || 
|-
|| Short Sarafand || UK ||  || Maritime patrol flying boat || 1932 || Prototype ||  || 
|-
|| Short Seaford || UK ||  || Maritime patrol flying boat || 1944 || Operational ||  || 
|-
|| Short Seamew || UK ||  || Maritime patrol || 1953 || Operational ||  || 
|-
|| Short Shetland || UK ||  || Maritime patrol flying boat || 1944 || Prototype ||  || 
|-
|| Short Shirl || UK ||  || Torpedo bomber || 1918 || Prototype ||  || 
|-
|| Short Singapore || UK ||  || Maritime patrol flying boat || 1926 || Operational ||  || 
|-
|| Short Sperrin || UK ||  || Heavy bomber || 1951 || Prototype ||  || 
|-
|| Short Stirling || UK ||  || Heavy bomber || 1939 || Operational ||  ||  
|-
|| Short Sturgeon || UK ||  || Reconnaissance bomber || 1946 || Prototypes ||  || 
|-
|| Short Sunderland || UK ||  || Maritime patrol flying boat || 1937 || Operational ||  || 
|-
|| Short Type 184 || UK ||  || Maritime patrol || 1915 || Operational ||  || 
|-
|| Short Type 320 || UK ||  || Maritime patrol || 1916 || Operational ||  || 
|-
|| Short Type 827 & 830 || UK ||  || Maritime patrol || 1914 || Operational ||  || 
|-
|| SIAI S.16 || Italy ||  || Maritime patrol flying boat || 1919 || Operational ||  ca. || 
|-
|| Siddeley-Deasy Siniai || UK ||  || Heavy bomber || 1921 || Prototype ||  || 
|-
|| Siemens-Schuckert R.I || Germany ||  || Heavy bomber || 1915 || Prototype ||  || 
|-
|| Siemens-Schuckert R.II || Germany ||  || Heavy bomber || 1915 || Prototype ||  || 
|-
|| Siemens-Schuckert R.III || Germany ||  || Heavy bomber || 1915 || Prototype ||  || 
|-
|| Siemens-Schuckert R.IV || Germany ||  || Heavy bomber || 1916 || Prototype ||  || 
|-
|| Siemens-Schuckert R.IX || Germany ||  || Heavy bomber || n/a || cancelled project ||  || 
|-
|| Siemens-Schuckert R.V || Germany ||  || Heavy bomber || 1916 || Prototype ||  || 
|-
|| Siemens-Schuckert R.VI || Germany ||  || Heavy bomber || 1916 || Prototype ||  || 
|-
|| Siemens-Schuckert R.VII || Germany ||  || Heavy bomber || 1917 || Prototype ||  || 
|-
|| Siemens-Schuckert R.VIII || Germany ||  || Heavy bomber || n/a || Prototype ||  || 
|-
|| Sikorsky Ilya Muromets || Russia ||  || Heavy bomber || 1913 || Operational || + || 
|-
|| SNCASE Baroudeur || France ||  || Fighter bomber || 1953 || Prototype ||  || 
|-
|| Soko G-4 Super Galeb || Yugoslavia ||  || Attack || 1978 || Operational ||  ||  
|-
|| Soko J-22 Orao & IAR-93 || Yugoslavia/Romania ||  || Attack || 1974 || Operational ||  || 
|-
|| Sopwith 1½ Strutter || UK ||  || Reconnaissance bomber || 1915 || Operational ||  || 
|-
|| Sopwith B.1 || UK ||  || Torpedo bomber || 1917 || Prototype ||  || 
|-
|| Sopwith Cuckoo || UK ||  || Torpedo bomber || 1918 || Operational ||  || 
|-
|| Sopwith Rhino || UK ||  || Attack || 1918 || Prototype ||  || 
|-
|| Sopwith Special torpedo seaplane Type C || UK ||  || Torpedo bomber || 1914 || Prototype ||  || 
|-
|| Sopwith Type 860 || UK ||  || Torpedo bomber || 1914 || Operational ||  || 
|-
|| SPCA 30 || France ||  || Light bomber || 1931 || Prototype ||  || 
|-
|| Sud Aviation Vautour || France ||  || Medium bomber || 1958 || Operational ||  ||  
|-
|| Sukhoi Su-17 || USSR ||  || Fighter bomber || 1966 || Operational ||  || 
|-
|| Sukhoi Su-2 || USSR ||  || Reconnaissance bomber || 1937 || Operational ||  || 
|-
|| Sukhoi Su-24 || USSR ||  || Attack || 1967 || Operational ||  ca. || 
|-
|| Sukhoi Su-25 || USSR ||  || Attack || 1975 || Operational ||  || 
|-
|| Sukhoi Su-34 || USSR ||  || Fighter bomber || 1990 || Operational ||  || 
|-
|| Sukhoi Su-6 || USSR ||  || Attack || 1941 || Prototype ||  || 
|-
|| Sukhoi Su-7 || USSR ||  || Fighter bomber || 1955 || Operational ||  || 
|-
|| Sukhoi Su-8 || USSR ||  || Attack || 1944 || Prototype ||  || 
|-
|| Sukhoi T-4 || USSR ||  || Heavy bomber || 1972 || Prototype ||  || 
|-
|| Supermarine B.12/36 || UK ||  || Heavy bomber || n/a || prototype destroyed ||  || 
|-
|| Supermarine Nanok || UK ||  || Torpedo bomber flying boat || 1927 || Prototype ||  || 
|-
|| Supermarine Scapa || UK ||  || Maritime patrol flying boat || 1932 || Prototype ||  || 
|-
|| Supermarine Southampton || UK ||  || Maritime patrol flying boat || 1925 || Operational ||  || 
|-
|| Supermarine Stranraer || UK ||  || Maritime patrol flying boat || 1934 || Operational ||  || 
|-
|| Supermarine Type 322 || UK ||  || Torpedo/dive bomber || 1943 || Prototype ||  || 
|-
|| Tachikawa Ki-36 || Japan ||  || Reconnaissance bomber || 1938 || Operationals ||  || 
|-
|| Tachikawa Ki-74 || Japan ||  || Reconnaissance bomber || 1944 || Prototype ||  || 
|-
|| Tarrant Tabor || UK ||  || Heavy bomber || 1919 || Prototype ||  || 
|-
|| Tupolev SB || USSR ||  || Medium bomber || 1934 || Operational ||  || 
|-
|| Tupolev TB-1 || USSR ||  || Heavy bomber || 1925 || Operational ||  || 
|-
|| Tupolev TB-3 || USSR ||  || Heavy bomber || 1930 || Operational ||  || 
|-
|| Tupolev TB-4 || USSR ||  || Heavy bomber || 1933 || Prototype ||  || 
|-
|| Tupolev TB-6 || USSR ||  || Heavy bomber || n/a || Project ||  || 
|-
|| Tupolev Tu-14 || USSR ||  || Torpedo bomber || 1949 || Operational ||  ca. || 
|-
|| Tupolev Tu-142 || USSR ||  || Maritime patrol || 1968 || Operational ||  || 
|-
|| Tupolev Tu-16 || USSR ||  || Heavy bomber || 1952 || Operational ||  || 
|-
|| Tupolev Tu-160 || USSR ||  || Heavy bomber || 1981 || Operational ||  || 
|-
|| Tupolev Tu-2 || USSR ||  || Medium bomber || 1941 || Operationals ||  || 
|-
|| Tupolev Tu-22 || USSR ||  || Medium bomber || 1962 || Operational ||  || 
|-
|| Tupolev Tu-22M || USSR ||  || Heavy bomber || 1969 || Operational ||  || 
|-
|| Tupolev Tu-4 || USSR ||  || Heavy bomber || 1947 || Operational ||  || 
|-
|| Tupolev Tu-85 || USSR ||  || Heavy bomber || 1951 || Prototype ||  || 
|-
|| Tupolev Tu-95 || USSR ||  || Heavy bomber || 1952 || Operational || + || 
|-
|| Vickers Valiant || UK ||  || Reconnaissance bomber || 1927 || Prototype ||  || 
|-
|| Vickers Type 207 || UK ||  || Torpedo bomber || 1933 || Prototype ||  || 
|-
|| Vickers Type 253 || UK ||  || Reconnaissance bomber || 1934 || Prototype ||  || 
|-
|| Vickers Valentia || UK ||  || Bomber/transport || 1934 || Operational ||  || 
|-
|| Vickers Valiant || UK || Jet || Heavy bomber || 1951 || Operational ||  || 
|-
|| Vickers Valparaiso || UK ||  || Reconnaissance bomber || 1923 || Operational ||  || 
|-
|| Vickers Vanox || UK ||  || Heavy bomber || 1929 || Prototype ||  || 
|-
|| Vickers Vincent and Vildebeest || UK ||  || Torpedo bomber || 1928 || Operational ||  || 
|-
|| Vickers Vimy || UK ||  || Heavy bomber || 1917 || Operational ||  || 
|-
|| Vickers Virginia || UK ||  || Heavy bomber || 1922 || Operational ||  || 
|-
|| Vickers Vixen || UK ||  || Reconnaissance bomber || 1923 || Operational ||  || 
|-
|| Vickers Warwick || UK ||  || Maritime patrol || 1939 || Operational ||  || 
|-
|| Vickers Wellesley || UK ||  || Reconnaissance bomber || 1935 || Operational ||  || 
|-
|| Vickers Wellington || UK ||  || Medium bomber || 1936 || Operational ||  || 
|-
|| Vickers Windsor || UK ||  || Heavy bomber || 1943 || Prototype ||  || 
|-
|| Vickers Victory Bomber || UK ||  || Heavy bomber || n/a || cancelled 1941 project ||  || 
|-
|| Voisin III || France ||  || Reconnaissance bomber || 1914 || Operational || + || 
|-
|| Voisin V || France ||  || Reconnaissance bomber || 1915 || Operational ||  ca. || 
|-
|| Voisin VIII || France ||  || Reconnaissance bomber || 1916 || Operational ||  ca. || 
|-
|| Voisin X || France ||  || Reconnaissance bomber || 1917 || Operational ||  ca. || 
|-
|| Voisin XI || France ||  || Reconnaissance bomber || 1918 || Operational ||  ca. || 
|-
|| Voisin XII || France ||  || Night bomber || 1918 || Prototype ||  || 
|-
|| Vought F4U Corsair || US ||  || Fighter bomber || 1940 || Operational ||  || 
|-
|| Vought SB2U Vindicator/Chesapeake || US ||  || Dive bomber || 1936 || Operational ||  || 
|-
|| Vultee Vengeance || US ||  || Dive bomber || 1941 || Operational ||  || 
|-
|| Vultee V-11 || US ||  || Attack || 1935 || Operational ||  || 
|-
|| Weiss WM-21 Sólyom || Hungary ||  || Reconnaissance bomber || 1937 || Operational ||  || 
|-
|| Westland Lysander || UK ||  || Reconnaissance bomber || 1936 || Operational ||  || 
|-
|| Westland PV-3 || UK ||  || Torpedo bomber || 1931 || Prototype ||  || 
|-
|| Westland Wallace || UK ||  || Reconnaissance bomber || 1931 || Operational ||  || 
|-
|| Westland Wapiti || UK ||  || Reconnaissance bomber || 1927 || Operational ||  || 
|-
|| Westland Witch || UK ||  || Reconnaissance bomber || 1928 || Prototype ||  || 
|-
|| Wight Seaplane || UK ||  || Maritime patrol || 1915 || Operational ||  || 
|-
|| Witteman-Lewis XNBL-1 (Barling Bomber) || US ||  || Heavy bomber || 1923 || Prototype ||  || 
|-
|| Xian H-6 || China ||  || Medium bomber || 1959 || Operational || + || 
|-
|| Xian H-8 || China ||  || Bomber || 1978 || Prototype ||  || 
|-
|| Xian JH-7 || China ||  || Fighter bomber || 1988 || Operational || + || 
|-
|| Yakovlev Yak-26 || USSR ||  || tactical bomber || 1956 || Prototype ||  || 
|-
|| Yakovlev Yak-28 || USSR ||  || Reconnaissance bomber || 1958 || Operational ||  || 
|-
|| Yermolayev Yer-2 || USSR ||  || Medium bomber || 1940 || Operational ||  ca. || 
|-
|| Yokosuka B3Y || Japan ||  || Torpedo bomber || 1933 || Operational ||  || 
|-
|| Yokosuka B4Y || Japan ||  || Torpedo bomber || 1935 || Operational ||  || 
|-
|| Yokosuka D4Y || Japan ||  || Dive bomber || 1940 || Operational ||  || 
|-
|| Yokosuka E1Y || Japan ||  || Reconnaissance bomber || 1923 || Operational ||  || 
|-
|| Yokosuka P1Y || Japan ||  || Bomber || 1943 || Operational ||  || 
|-
|| Zeppelin-Lindau Rs.I || Germany ||  || Maritime patrol flying boat || n/a || prototype destroyed ||  || 
|-
|| Zeppelin-Lindau Rs.II || Germany ||  || Maritime patrol flying boat || 1916 || Prototype ||  || 
|-
|| Zeppelin-Lindau Rs.III || Germany ||  || Maritime patrol flying boat || 1917 || Prototype ||  || 
|-
|| Zeppelin-Lindau Rs.IV || Germany ||  || Maritime patrol flying boat || 1918 || Prototype ||  || 
|-
|| Zeppelin-Staaken R.IV || Germany ||  || Heavy bomber || 1915 || Prototype ||  || 
|-
|| Zeppelin-Staaken R.V || Germany ||  || Heavy bomber || 1917 || Prototype ||  || 
|-
|| Zeppelin-Staaken R.VI || Germany ||  || Heavy bomber || 1916 || Operational ||  || 
|-
|| Zeppelin-Staaken R.VII || Germany ||  || Heavy bomber || 1917 || Prototype ||  || 
|-
|| Zeppelin-Staaken R.XIV || Germany ||  || Heavy bomber || 1919 || Prototype ||  || 
|-
|| Zeppelin-Staaken R.XV || Germany ||  || Heavy bomber || 1918 || Prototype ||  || 
|-
|| Zeppelin-Staaken R.XVI || Germany ||  || Heavy bomber || 1918 || Prototype ||  || 
|-
|| Zeppelin-Staaken VGO.I || Germany ||  || Heavy bomber || 1915 || crashed 1915 ||  || 
|-
|| Zeppelin-Staaken VGO.II || Germany ||  || Heavy bomber || 1915 || Prototype ||  || 
|-
|| Zeppelin-Staaken VGO.III/R.III || Germany ||  || Heavy bomber || 1915 || Prototype ||  || 
|}

See also 
 List of fighter aircraft
 List of aircraft of the RAF
 List of Chinese aircraft
 List of military aircraft of France
 List of military aircraft of Germany
 List of military aircraft of the Soviet Union and the CIS
 List of military aircraft of the United States

References

Lists of aircraft by role
Lists of military aircraft